Theodoros Manetas (c. 1881–1947) was a Hellenic Army officer who rose to the rank of lieutenant general and served as Chief of the Hellenic Army General Staff in 1931–1933. He also served thrice in ministerial positions and was elected to parliament in 1946.

Military career 
He was born in Tripoli in about 1881, the son of the politician Panagiotis Manetas, the youngest brother of Lieutenant General Konstantinos Manetas and of the politician Ioannis Manetas.

After finishing school, he enrolled in the Hellenic Army Academy and graduated on 6 July 1902 as an Artillery Second Lieutenant. He was promoted to lieutenant in 1909, and spent the period 1910–1912 studying in France. He returned to take part in the Balkan Wars of 1912–1913 as a battery commander, and was promoted to captain in 1913 and major in 1915.

During World War I, he joined the Venizelist Movement of National Defence and fought in the Macedonian front leading artillery battalions and regiments. In 1917 he was promoted to Lt. Colonel and assigned as head of the Personnel Department in the Ministry of Military Affairs. In 1918 he was reassigned to the front, assuming the post of artillery chief of the Cretan Division and taking part in the Battle of Doiran.

In 1919 he was promoted to full colonel, but was dismissed from the Army in November 1920 following the Venizelist electoral defeat. After the disastrous defeat of the Greek army in Anatolia by the Turkish nationalist forces in August 1922 and the subsequent outbreak of a military revolt, he was recalled to active service by the new revolutionary government and named Inspector of Artillery. Promoted to major general in 1924, he quarrelled with the dictator Theodoros Pangalos in 1925 and resigned, only to be recalled to his post soon after.

On 27 October 1928 he was named Vice-Minister of Military Affairs in Eleftherios Venizelos' cabinet, a post he held until 9 June 1929. Promoted to lieutenant general, he was then given command of II Army Corps. In August 1931, he was appointed Chief of the Army General Staff, remaining at this post until 15 July 1933, when he re-assumed command of II Corps. He was involved in the unsuccessful Venizelist coup attempt in March 1935 and was dismissed from the Army on 30 April, following the coup's suppression.

Political career 
Following the liberation of Greece from the Axis occupation, on 21 March 1945 Manetas was appointed as Minister Governor-General for Northern Greece in the Nikolaos Plastiras cabinet, a post he held until 16 April, a few days into the Petros Voulgaris cabinet. He then held the post of Minister of Military Affairs in the Themistoklis Sofoulis cabinet, from 22 November 1945 until 4 April 1946, and was pro tempore also Minister of Aviation in 22–26 November. Manetas elected to the Hellenic Parliament in the March 1946 elections on the Liberal Party ticket for his home province of Arcadia, holding the seat until his death in 1947.

References

1880s births
1947 deaths
20th-century Greek people
Hellenic Army lieutenant generals
Chiefs of the Hellenic Army General Staff
Greek military personnel of World War I
People from Tripoli, Greece
Ministers of Military Affairs of Greece
Greek MPs 1946–1950
Governors-General of Northern Greece
20th-century Greek military personnel